The Max Planck Institute of Biochemistry (MPIB) is a research institute of the Max Planck Society located in Martinsried, a suburb of Munich. The institute was founded in 1973 by the merger of three formerly independent institutes: the Max Planck Institute of Biochemistry, the Max Planck Institute of Protein and Leather Research (founded 1954 in Regensburg), and the Max Planck Institute of Cell Chemistry (founded 1956 in Munich).

With 800 employees in currently seven research departments and about 26 research groups, the MPIB is one of the largest biologically medically oriented institutes of the Max Planck Society.

Departments

There are seven departments currently in the institute.

 Cellular Biochemistry (Franz-Ulrich Hartl)
 Cellular and Molecular Biophysics (Petra Schwille)
 Molecular Machines and Signaling (Brenda Schulman)
 Molecular Medicine (Reinhard Fässler)
 Molecular Structural Biology (Wolfgang Baumeister)
 Proteomics and Signal Transduction (Matthias Mann)
 Structural Cell Biology  (Elena Conti)

Research groups

There are 26 research groups currently based at the MPIB, including 3 emeritus research groups:

 Molecular Structural Biology (Wolfgang Baumeister / Cryo-Electron Tomography, Electron Microscopical Structure Research, Protein and Cell Structure, Protein Degradation)
Molecular Mechanisms of DNA Repair (Christian Biertümpfel / Structural Biology, DNA Repair, DNA Replication, DNA Recombination, Protein-DNA-Interactions)
Systems Biology of Membrane Trafficking (Georg Borner / Proteomic Microscope, Membrane Trafficking, AP-4 Mediated Protein Transport, Quantitative Mass Spectrometry, Dynamic Organellar Maps)
Structural Cell Biology (Elena Conti / Structural Studies, RNA Transport, RNA Surveillance, RNA Degradation)
Computational Systems Biochemistry (Jürgen Cox / Systems Biology, Proteomics, Mass Spectrometry, Bioinformatics)
Structure and Dynamics of Molecular Machines (Karl Duderstadt / DNA Replication Dynamics, Structural Biology, Single-Molecule Imaging, Biophysics)
Molecular Medicine (Reinhard Fässler / Integrin, Adhesion Signalling, Mouse Genetics)
Cell Dynamics (Günther Gerisch / Phagocytosis, Actin Dynamics, Cell Motility)
Cellular Biochemistry (Franz-Ulrich Hartl / Molecular Chaperones, Protein Folding, Protostasis, Aging and Neurodegenerative Diseases)
Chaperonin-assisted Protein Folding (Manajit Hayer-Hartl / Protein Folding and Assembly, Rubisco, GroEL and GroES, Mass Spectrometry)
Molecular Mechanisms of Inflammation (Veit Hornung / Immunology, Inflammation, Innate Immunity)
Structure Research (Robert Huber / Structural Biology, Methods of Protein Crystallography, Protein Degradation, Medicinal Chemistry)
Molecular Imaging and Bionanotechnology (Ralf Jungmann / Super-Resolution Microscopy, DNA Nanotechnology, Biophysics, Single-Molecule Studies)
Neuroinflammation and Mucosal Immunology (Gurumoorthy Krishnamoorthy / Microbiome, Autoimmunity, Multiple Sclerosis, Immune Signaling)
Proteomics and Signal Transduction (Matthias Mann / Mass Spectrometry, Systems Biology, Bioinformatics, Cancer)
Experimental Systems Immunology (Felix Meissner / Immunology, Inflammation, Cellular Communication, Proteomics, Systems Biology)
Cellular and Membrane Trafficking (Naoko Mizuno / Structural Biology, Cryo Electron Microscopy, Biophysics, Membrane Trafficking, Membrane Curvature)
Chromatin Biology (Jürg Müller / Genetics and Biochemistry of Chromatin, Transcription, Histone Modifications, Drosophila Development)
Immunoregulation (Peter Murray / Immunity, Macrophage: T cell cross-talk, Self-Tolerance, Amino Acid metabolism)
Biomimetic Systems (Hannes Mutschler / Synthetic Biology, Replication, Evolution, RNA, Origin of Life)
Translational Medicine (Inaam Nakchbandi / Fibronectin, Integrin, Bone, Disease)
Mechanisms of Protein Biogenesis (Danny Nedialkova / RNA Biology; Translation Dynamics; Protein Folding; Systems Biology)
DNA Replication & Genome Integrity (Boris Pfander / DNA Replication, Checkpoints, DNA damage, Posttranslational Modifications, Yeast)
Molecular Machines and Signaling (Brenda Schulman / Structural Biology, Ubiquitin Proteasome System, Ubiquitin-like Proteins)
Cellular and Molecular Biophysics (Petra Schwille / Biophysics, Fluorescence Correlation Spectroscopy, Atomic Force Microscopy, Single Molecule, Synthetic Biology)
Chromosome Biology (Wolfgang Zachariae / Cell division, Meiosis)

Graduate Program
The International Max Planck Research School (IMPRS) for Molecular and Cellular Life Sciences is a PhD program covering various aspects of life science ranging from biochemistry to molecular medicine. The school is run in cooperation with the Max Planck Institute of Neurobiology, the Max Planck Institute of Psychiatry,  Ludwig Maximilian University of Munich, and the Technical University of Munich.

References

External links
 Homepage of the Max Planck Institute of Biochemistry
 Homepage of the International Max Planck Research School (IMPRS) for Molecular and Cellular Life Sciences

Biochemistry research institutes
Genetics in Germany
Biochemistry
Research institutes in Munich